"Tempo" is a song by Polish singer Margaret. It was written by Anderz Wrethov, Jimmy Jansson, Laurell Barker and Sebastian von Koenigsegg. The song was released on 9 February 2019 by Powerhouse and Warner Music.

On 27 November 2018, Swedish broadcaster Sveriges Television (SVT) announced that Margaret was one of the artists taking part in Melodifestivalen 2019, Sweden's national selection for Eurovision Song Contest 2019, with "Tempo". She placed fifth in the second semi-final of the competition which took place on 9 February 2019 in Malmö Arena, and was subsequently eliminated.

The single charted in the top 10 in Poland and in the top 50 in Sweden.

Music video
"Tempo" has two music videos labelled "Up" and "Down" which make one music video when put together on two separate mobile devices with the device on top playing the "Up" version of the video and the device below playing the "Down" version at the same time. Both versions, directed by Maciej Bieliński, were released on 25 April 2019.

Track listing
Digital single
 "Tempo" – 2:49

Accolades

Charts

Weekly charts

Year-end charts

Release history

References

2019 singles
2019 songs
Margaret (singer) songs
Melodifestivalen songs of 2019
Songs written by Jimmy Jansson
Songs written by Wrethov
Warner Music Group singles
Songs written by Laurell (singer)